Nathaniel Erskine-Smith  (born June 15, 1984) is a Canadian politician who is the member of Parliament (MP) for Beaches—East York. A member of the Liberal Party, Erskine-Smith was elected to the House of Commons following the 2015 federal election. Before entering politics, Erskine-Smith was a commercial litigation lawyer.

Early life and education 
Erskine-Smith was born in Toronto, Ontario, attending Bowmore Elementary School and Malvern Collegiate. His parents, Sara Erskine and Lawrence Smith, were public school teachers.

Erskine-Smith attended Queen's University, where he completed a Bachelor of Arts degree in politics in 2007, before completing law school in 2010. While a student at Queen's, Erskine-Smith was an unsuccessful candidate for city council for Sydenham District in Kingston, Ontario, in the 2006 municipal elections. He then went on to study political philosophy and constitutional law at the University of Oxford, where he earned a Master of Laws (BCL) degree in 2013

Legal career 

Erskine-Smith practised commercial litigation as an associate at Kramer Simaan Dhillon, after working as a law student at Aird & Berlis LLP. He also performed volunteer work for the Canadian Civil Liberties Association.

He worked pro bono for a range of clients and causes, including a civil liberties case to protect religious freedom in Ontario's school system. In a notable civil liberties case in 2014, Erskine-Smith successfully argued against compulsory religious studies at publicly funded high schools in Ontario.

Political career

42nd Parliament (2015-2019)

Committee work 
Erskine-Smith served as a member of the Public Safety and National Security Committee, and as the Vice-Chair of the Access to Information, Privacy and Ethics committee in the 42nd parliament.

Other roles 
He served as the president of the Canadian group of the Inter-Parliamentary Union for a one-year term in 2016. In that capacity, he delivered a speech about youth in politics at an IPU meeting in Zambia.

Independence 
Erskine-Smith has been called as Canada's most independent parliamentarian, with the National Post has described him as “maverick” and CBC describing him as Ottawa's “least predictable MP.” Erskine-Smith described his position in an op-ed in the Toronto Star, writing:

Animal welfare and Bill C-246 
In 2015, Erskine-Smith seconded Bill S-203, the Ending the Captivity of Whales and Dolphins Act, that became law in June 2019. The bill prohibits the captivity of cetaceans and requires permits to import and export them to and from Canada. Erskine-Smith spoke to the house about the importance of the bill in June 2018.

On February 26, 2016, Erskine-Smith introduced Bill C-246, the Modernizing Animal Protections Act, to ban the import of shark fins and make Canada's animal cruelty laws tougher. The bill won support from EndCruelty, a coalition of Canadians who support stronger animal protection laws. Due to concerns from animal use lobbyists, the bill was defeated 198 to 84 at second reading. Two years later, a government bill addressing similar concerns was tabled by Justice Minister Jody Wilson-Raybould. She acknowledged Erskine-Smith's efforts as a precursor to the government's legislation. The defeat of Erskine-Smith's Bill C-246 led to the creation of the Liberal Animal Welfare Caucus in 2017. On September 5, 2017, Erskine-Smith wrote a piece in Now Magazine addressing his veganism and the importance of a social change towards the treatment of animals.

Animal welfare awards 
In 2016, Erskine-Smith received the Humane Legislator Award from Animal Justice for his efforts to modernize Canada's federal animal protection laws with Bill C-246. In 2017, Erskine-Smith received the Fur-Bearers’ Clements award for his dedication to improving the lives of animals with Bill C-246. In 2019, Erskine-Smith was awarded the Toronto Vegetarian Association Lisa Grill Compassion for Animals Award for his compassion and commitment toward animals. He was also recognized by Humane Canada for his dedication to ending animal abuse.

Climate action and Bill C-454 
In October 2018, Erskine-Smith called an emergency debate on climate change in Parliament in response to the Intergovernmental Panel on Climate Change's special report on global warming. He requested action to be taken by the government and Canadians to ensure that Canada can reduce its emissions and reach the targeted goals. On June 5, 2019, Erskine-Smith introduced Bill C-454, the Net-Zero Greenhouse Gas Emissions Act, to require the Government of Canada to reduce GHG emissions to net zero by 2050.

Drug policy reform and Bill C-460 
Erskine-Smith believes that the war on drugs has been a failure. He has been a vocal supporter of cannabis legalization and regulation, and has called for a new approach to treat drug use as a health issue. In February 2016, Erskine-Smith represented the Canadian government's pro-marijuana legalization views to a joint United Nations/Inter-Parliamentary Union conference reviewing how different countries were dealing with illegal drugs. He partnered with Mexican Senator Laura Rojas to argue that countries should seek alternatives to incarceration in cases where individuals have drugs solely for personal use. In early January 2017, Erskine-Smith published an op-ed in Vice News Canada calling for the decriminalization of all drug possession as a logical next step to the government's progressive drug policy. In late January 2017, Erskine-Smith delivered a speech in the House of Commons in support of Bill C-37, to expand access to safe injection clinics across Canada. In the first episode of the television series Political Blind Date in 2017, Erskine-Smith and Conservative MP Garnett Genuis discussed their differing perspectives on the legalization of marijuana in Canada. Erskine-Smith introduced a Liberal caucus policy resolution to address the opioid crisis through a public health approach, and it was adopted as the second overall priority by the grassroots Liberal membership at the Liberal Policy Convention in Halifax in April 2018.

Bill C-460 
To ensure more people access treatment, Erskine-Smith introduced a bill to remove criminal sanctions for low-level possession and to reduce the stigma associated with seeking treatment. In 2018, Erskine-Smith appeared on CBC's Power & Politics to speak about his disappointment in the Liberal government's signing of the United States’ ‘War on Drugs’ document. He argued it brought the conversation about drugs away from a health issue, which ran counter to his push for drug decriminalization and domestic policy at the time.

Cannabis record expungement 
Erskine-Smith seconded a bill introduced by New Democratic MP Murray Rankin. In March 2019, Erskine-Smith wrote an op-ed for NOW Magazine where he discussed his support for Rankin's bill, stating that only expungements would address the injustice of cannabis criminalization.

Privacy work 
In 2017, Erskine-Smith traveled to Washington  with the Access to Information, Privacy and Ethics committee to attend a congressional hearing on the Equifax data breach, and met with Congressmen from the Digital Commerce subcommittee, with Facebook privacy experts, and with officials from the Federal Trade Commission. In May 2018, Erskine-Smith scrutinized Facebook  officials at the Standing Committee on Access to Information, Privacy and Ethics  regarding the Cambridge Analytica scandal and the extent of privacy breaches for Canadians. In 2018, Erskine-Smith participated as the Canadian delegation in the U.K.’s International Grand Committee on social media and disinformation. In total, 24 officials from 9 countries representing 447 million people participated. In June 2018, Erskine-Smith introduced Bill-C413, an Act to amend the Personal Information Protection and Electronic Documents Act, to give new powers for the Privacy Commissioner to better protect our privacy. In May 2019, Erskine-Smith participated in the Canadian delegation of the International Grand Committee  to meet with representatives from Google, Facebook and Twitter, among others. The Silicon Valley representatives were asked to defend their companies' records on protecting users' data. In August 2019, Erskine-Smith wrote an op-ed for the Toronto Star expressing his desire for the right to be forgotten. He explained that in an increasingly connected, online world citizens should have the right to hide content published about them from search engines if the individual’s privacy is being seriously violated.

43rd Parliament (2019-2021)

Support for universal pharmaceutical provision 
In February 2021, alongside Wayne Long, Erskine-Smith was one of only two Liberal MPs to vote in favour of an New Democratic Party (NDP) motion to take a first step towards developing a national pharmacare system. The bill, proposed by Peter Julian, would have established the conditions for federal financial contributions to provincial drug insurance plans. The following year, the Liberal Party would commit to work towards a "universal national pharmacare program" as part of their confidence and supply agreement with the NDP following the 2021 federal election.

Committee work 
Erskine-Smith is a member of the Standing Committee on Industry, Science and Technology.

Bill C-235 and C-236 
In 2020, Erskine-Smith introduced Bill C-235. This bill would delete the drug possession offence from the Criminal Code.

He also introduced Bill C-236, which would provide diversion options to law enforcement, crown attorneys, and judges for drug possession cases.

Gun Control

In an op-ed published in October of 2019, Erskine-Smith stated his belief that minority governments hold potential for greatness, among various other campaign talking points Erskine-Smith advocates for stronger gun control.

44th Parliament (2022- )

Emergencies Act

In response to the occupation of downtown Ottawa by the so-called "Freedom Convoy", the government enacted the Emergencies Act. With Ottawa streets being largely cleared of protesters by the time of the vote, Erskine-Smith's Speech to Parliament condemned the protests, but questioned the use of the Act, and its approval after the clearance. He ultimately voted with the Act, as it was a confidence motion.

Personal life 
Erskine-Smith was raised vegetarian, and is now vegan. He has Crohn's disease.

Erskine-Smith married Amelia (Amy) Symington, a prominent Toronto vegan chef and nutritionist, on her family farm in Camlachie, Ontario. The two met in an undergraduate film studies course at Queen's University. They have two sons, Mackinlay, born in 2016, and Crawford, born in 2019.

Electoral record

|- style="background-color:#fcfcfc;"
!rowspan="2" colspan="2" style="text-align:center;" |Candidate
!colspan="3" style="text-align:center;" |Popular vote
|- style="background-color:#fcfcfc;"
| style="text-align:center;" | Votes
| style="text-align:center;" |%
| style="text-align:center;" |±%
|-
| style="background-color:#cccccc;" |
| style="text-align:left;" | Bill Glover
| style="text-align:right;" | 1,180
| style="text-align:right;" | 46.24%
| style="text-align:right;" | -
|-
| style="background-color:#cccccc;" |
| style="text-align:left;" | Floyd Patterson
| style="text-align:right;" | 912
| style="text-align:right;" | 35.74%
| style="text-align:right;" |-
|-
| style="background-color:#cccccc;" |
| style="text-align:left;" | Nathaniel Erskine-Smith
| style="text-align:right;" | 297
| style="text-align:right;" | 11.64%
| style="text-align:right;" | -
|-
| style="background-color:#cccccc;" |
| style="text-align:left;" | Alex Huntley
| style="text-align:right;" | 163
| style="text-align:right;" | 6.39%
| style="text-align:right;" | -
|-
| style="text-align:right;background-color:#FFFFFF;" colspan="2" |Total votes
| style="text-align:right;background-color:#FFFFFF;" |2,552
| style="text-align:right;background-color:#c2c2c2;" colspan="3" |
|- 
|}

References

External links

Campaign Website

1984 births
Alumni of the University of Oxford
Lawyers in Ontario
Liberal Party of Canada MPs
Living people
Members of the House of Commons of Canada from Ontario
People from Old Toronto
Politicians from Toronto
Queen's University at Kingston alumni
21st-century Canadian politicians